The finals and the qualifying heats of the Men's 4×100 metres Freestyle Relay event at the 1997 FINA Short Course World Championships were held on the last day of the competition, on Sunday 20 April 1997 in Gothenburg, Sweden.

Final

Qualifying heats

See also
1996 Men's Olympic Games 4x100m Freestyle Relay
1997 Men's European LC Championships 4x100m Freestyle Relay

References
 Results

R